Sergio Boris is an Argentine film actor.
He is best known for his performance in Diarios de motocicleta (2004) and El Abrazo partido (2004).

Filmography
Sólo por hoy (2001) aka Just for Today
Animalada (2001) aka Animal 
¿Sabés nadar? (2002)
Diarios de motocicleta (2004) aka The Motorcycle Diaries 
El Abrazo partido (2004) aka Lost Embrace 
Whisky Romeo Zulu (2004)
Solos (2005)
Mientras tanto (2006)
Lejana, distante (2006, short)  
El niño de barro (2006)
Devil (2011)
Juan y Eva (2011)
Everybody Has a Plan (2012)
The Corporation (2012)
Lock Charmer (2014)

References

External links
 
 

Argentine male film actors
Living people
Year of birth missing (living people)
Place of birth missing (living people)